The Nicholas-Beazley NB-3, or Barling NB-3, is a two-seat, training aircraft of the 1920s.

Design
The Barling NB-3 was designed by Walter Barling in 1927. The aircraft was advertised as being able to right itself from any position with hands off the controls and also as being spin-proof. The NB-3 is a low wing tandem-seat, open cockpit aircraft with conventional landing gear. The fuselage was constructed of welded chrome-moly steel tubing with aircraft fabric covering. The wings used a unique double layered corrugated aluminum skin with a smooth exterior that required custom presses to handle the various thicknesses of material along the span. The center section was straight with dihedral in the outer bays. The spar was also aluminum with a U shaped profile. The aircraft was powered by an Anzani 3 cylinder radial engine, Superior radial or LeBlond 60-5-D. The main gear used long struts attached to the upper fuselage for the largest landing gear geometry. The NB-3 fuselage was widened, giving one cockpit a side-by side seating arrangement to accommodate 3 people. The new aircraft was named the NB-4.

Operational history
The NB-3 was test flown by Claude Sterling in February 1929. The plane competed in the 1929 National Air Races, placing first or second in events in its class. The Marshall Flying School advertised the NB-3 as a one-day-to-learn-to-fly aircraft with students flying in the morning, an aerodynamics class, learning how to weld by mid-afternoon, salesmanship, and a leisure round of boxing and swimming by evening. Ruth Alexander established a new world record for altitude in 1930 using an NB-3 over San Diego, California. A NB-3 is on display at the N-B plant's hometown airport in Marshall, Missouri.

Variants
NB-3
 Anzani powered - 3 built
NB-3G
Armstrong-Siddely Genet Mk II 
NB-3L 
Lambert 
NB-3V
 Velie M-5  1 built
NB-4G
 Side-by-side variant with Armstrong-Siddely Genet Mk II 
NB-4L 
 Side-by-side variant with Lambert . ATC#365 issued 12-13-1930
NB-4W 
Side-by-side variant with Warner . ATC#386 issued 12-13-1930

Specifications (NB-3)

References

External links
image of a NB-3

1920s United States civil utility aircraft
Low-wing aircraft
Aircraft first flown in 1928
Single-engined tractor aircraft